Philodromus catagraphus is a spider species found in Spain.

See also 
 List of Philodromidae species

References

External links 

catagraphus
Spiders of Europe
Spiders described in 1870